James Corry may refer to:

James Corry (academic) (1899–1985), Canadian academic
James Corry (Canadian politician) (1895–1968), Canadian Member of Parliament for Perth
James Corry (Irish politician) (1634–1718), Irish MP for Fermanagh
Sir James Corry, 1st Baronet (1826–1891), MP for Belfast and Armagh Mid
Sir James Corry, 3rd Baronet (1892–1987), of the Corry baronets
Sir James Michael Corry, 5th Baronet (born 1946), of the Corry baronets

See also
Herbert Cory (Sir James Herbert Cory, 1st Baronet, 1857–1933), Welsh politician and ship-owner
James Corey (disambiguation)
Corry (disambiguation)